Cedar Bluff State Park is a public recreation area located  southeast of WaKeeney and  southwest of Ellis in Trego County, Kansas, United States.

The state park is divided into two areas, comprising , straddling the  Cedar Bluff Reservoir. The Bluffton Area— on the north shore—is the most developed and receives extensive use. The Page Creek Area— on the south shore—offers primitive camping as well as 36 utility sites. West of the Page Creek Area are the juniper-lined,  limestone bluffs from which the reservoir's name was derived (junipers were often misidentified as "cedars" by early settlers).

Threshing Machine Canyon, the site of an 1850s Native American attack on a wagon train bearing a threshing machine, is accessed by a road west of the park. In the historic canyon one can find carvings dating back to the mid-19th century.

Gallery

See also
 List of Kansas state parks
 List of lakes, reservoirs, and dams in Kansas
 List of rivers of Kansas

References

External links

Cedar Bluff State Park Kansas Department of Wildlife, Parks and Tourism
Cedar Bluff Reservoir Map Kansas Department of Wildlife, Parks and Tourism

State parks of Kansas
Protected areas of Trego County, Kansas